Educate Ghana is a module of NABCO which is an initiative set up by the government of Ghana to address the graduate unemployment in the country. The module is targeted at the education sector, so that various trainees would be deployed into various schools or various educational establishment.

References 

Government of Ghana